Richmond (1918–1983) was a parliamentary constituency centred on the town of Richmond. The seat mirrored for its first 47 years a small northern projection of Surrey (between Middlesex and the County of London). For the final 18 years its area, in local government, fell into the new county of Greater London.

Each winning candidate was a Unionist or from the allied Conservative Party.

Formally and informally on a local basis Richmond constituency; national publications usually added a reference to Surrey to distinguish Richmond (Yorks) (UK Parliament constituency) (1585–present).

History 
The constituency was created by the Representation of the People Act 1918 for the 1918 general election. The area had been roughly the northern part of Kingston (also in Surrey).

From April 1965 the constituency formed part of Greater London. It was the eastern half of the London Borough of Richmond upon Thames. The Second Periodical Review of the Parliamentary Boundary Commission for England in 1969 formally made "a slight modification in the names to conform with our policy of using the London borough name as a prefix", so that the constituency was formally known as 'Richmond upon Thames, Richmond'. Due to its prolix this was never used in the popular press. No boundary changes were made.

The seat was abolished for the 1983 general election; replaced by Richmond and Barnes which took in a small part of former Middlesex, the local government electoral ward of East Twickenham.

Single-member seat
Not based on an ancient borough or key town, it reflected the schema of  the third Great Reform three decades before its creation, continued by the Fourth Reform Act, Lloyd George's Representation of the People Act 1918 by returning one Member of Parliament (MP) to the House of Commons of the UK Parliament, elected by first past the post.

Boundaries
In 1918 the seat was created as a borough constituency of Surrey. It was in the north-west corner of the much-reduced county (in the 1880s) and adjoined the south bank of the River Thames. It comprised the Municipal Borough of Richmond which included Kew and Petersham, as well as the Urban Districts of Barnes and Ham.

In 1932 the Barnes Urban District was upgraded to a municipal borough. In the following year most of Ham was incorporated in the Municipal Borough of Richmond. These were local government reconfigurations.

In the redistribution of parliamentary seats which took effect in 1950, this seat was little changed. It was defined in the Representation of the People Act 1948 as comprising the Municipal Boroughs of Barnes and Richmond. There were some minor boundary changes to the two Municipal Boroughs, which affected the parliamentary seat from 1964 (per S.I. 1960–465).

Incorporated in Greater London from 1974, the redistribution of parliamentary seats which took effect in 1974 did not change the constituency boundaries. It did however recast the definition of the boundaries, which set the constituency as comprising the following wards of the London Borough: Barnes, East Sheen, Ham, Petersham, Kew, Mortlake, Palewell, Richmond Hill and Richmond Town.

Members of Parliament

Elections

Elections in the 1910s

Elections in the 1920s

supported by Anti-Waste League

Elections in the 1930s

Election in the 1940s

Elections in the 1950s

Elections in the 1960s

Elections in the 1970s

endorsed by the English National Party of Frank Hansford-Miller

See also
List of parliamentary constituencies in London

References

Sources
 Boundaries of Parliamentary Constituencies 1885–1972, compiled and edited by F.W.S. Craig (Parliamentary Reference Publications 1972)
 British Parliamentary Election Results 1918–1949, compiled and edited by F.W.S. Craig (The Macmillan Press 1977)

Parliamentary constituencies in London (historic)
Politics of the London Borough of Richmond upon Thames
Constituencies of the Parliament of the United Kingdom established in 1918
Constituencies of the Parliament of the United Kingdom disestablished in 1983